Pubitelphusa is a genus of moths in the family Gelechiidae.

Species
Pubitelphusa latifasciella (Chambers, 1875)
Pubitelphusa trigonalis (Park & Ponomarenko, 2007)

References

Litini
Moth genera